SV Golden Horizon is a steel-hulled five-masted barque rigged tall ship which is in service as a cruise ship. Originally named Flying Clipper, the luxury vessel was designed by Polish naval architect Zygmunt Choreń, for Star Clippers Ltd. of Sweden, and built by the Brodosplit Shipyard in Split, Croatia. She is the largest sailing ship ever launched. Her design was based on France II, a famous French five-mast cargo windjammer built in 1911.

Due to a dispute with the shipyard, she was never delivered to Star Clippers. Instead, she has been chartered by Tradewind Voyages and renamed Golden Horizon.

She entered into operation in May 2021. However the vessel was seized by UK authorities on the morning of the inaugural cruise over an ongoing financial dispute with Star Clippers.

Following withdrawal of finances by the Croatian owner of Golden Horizon, the Company 'Tradewind Voyages' has ceased trading.  The vessel languishes in Split with a threat of sale to raise funds following bankruptcy proceedings of the Owner's Croatian Company.

See also

 Royal Clipper
 Star Clipper
 Star Flyer
 List of cruise ships
 List of large sailing vessels

References

External links
 Flying Clipper Overview 
 Star Clippers' newest, biggest sailing ship, Flying Clipper, to start sail in 2018
 FLYING CLIPPER Named 
 Zwodowano największy żaglowiec świata. Zaprojektował go Zygmunt Choreń (wideo)

Cruise ships
Five-masted ships
Windjammers
Tall ships of Croatia
Tall ships of Monaco
Tall ships of Poland
Full-rigged ships
2017 ships